Quenton Terrell Lowery (born October 25, 1970) is an American former baseball player for the Chicago Cubs, Tampa Bay Devil Rays, and San Francisco Giants.

High school
Lowery attended Oakland Technical High School, graduating with a 25-points per game average in basketball and numerous all-area and all-state awards.

College
During his college basketball career at Loyola Marymount he appeared in an Elite Eight game, losing to UNLV. He was a teammate of Bo Kimble. He was the person who fed the alley-oop to Hank Gathers moments before Gathers' death.

Personal life
Terrell is currently married to Denise, and they have three children.

References

External links

1970 births
Living people
Chicago Cubs players
Loyola Marymount Lions baseball players
Loyola Marymount Lions men's basketball players
Tampa Bay Devil Rays players
San Francisco Giants players
Major League Baseball center fielders
Baseball players from Oakland, California
Basketball players from Oakland, California
African-American baseball players
Binghamton Mets managers
Butte Copper Kings players
Durham Bulls players
Fresno Grizzlies players
Gulf Coast Rangers players
Iowa Cubs players
Norfolk Tides players
Charlotte Rangers players
Tulsa Drillers players